Marie-Andrée Beaudoin served as borough mayor of Ahuntsic-Cartierville, located in Montreal, Quebec, Canada, from November 2005 to November 2009, representing the Union Montréal party. She has been a resident of the area since the early 1990s.  She did not run again in the 2009 Montreal municipal election, and Union lost the mayoralty race to Pierre Gagnier of Projet Montréal.

References
Ville de Montréal, Arrondissement d'Ahuntsic-Cartierville. "Conseil d'arrondissement." Archived on archive.org April 7, 2008.

Living people
Montreal city councillors
Mayors of places in Quebec
Women mayors of places in Quebec
People from Ahuntsic-Cartierville
Women municipal councillors in Canada
Year of birth missing (living people)